Pedro Diaz may refer to:

 Pedro Díaz de Tenorio (died 1399), archbishop of Toledo
 Pedro Antonio Díaz (1852–1919), acting President of Panama in 1918
 Pedro Díaz (baseball), (born 1910), Cuban professional baseball player
 Pedro Díaz Lobato (born 1973), Spanish cyclist
 Pedro Díaz (footballer) (born 1998), Spanish association football player
 Pedro Diaz (boxing) boxing trainer
 Pedro Díaz (missionary) (1546–1618), Spanish missionary

See also
 Pedro Dias (disambiguation)